The second season of The Mentalist premiered on September 24, 2009 and concluded in May 2010. It consists of 23 episodes. CBS moved the show from Tuesdays at 9:00 pm to Thursdays at 10:00 pm. The series was renewed for a second season in May 2009 by CBS. The second season of The Mentalist premiered in the United Kingdom on FIVE on Friday February 19, 2010 at 9:00 pm.

Cast and characters

Main cast 
 Simon Baker as Patrick Jane (23 episodes)
 Robin Tunney as Teresa Lisbon (23 episodes)
 Tim Kang as Kimball Cho (23 episodes)
 Owain Yeoman as Wayne Rigsby (23 episodes)
 Amanda Righetti as Grace Van Pelt (23 episodes)

Recurring cast 
 Gregory Itzin as Virgil Minelli (6 episodes; 1–3, 6–8)
 Terry Kinney as Sam Bosco (6 episodes; 1–3, 6–8)
 Aunjanue Ellis as Madeleine Hightower (6 episodes; 17–20, 22–23)
 JoNell Kennedy as Coroner Pat (3 episodes; 6, 8–9)
 Leslie Hope as Kristina Frye (2 episodes; 22–23)

Notable guest cast 
 Currie Graham as Walter Mashburn ("Redline")
 Raphael Sbarge as Hollis Dunninger ("Redemption")
 Paul Michael Glaser as Walter Crew ("The Scarlet Letter")
 Mark Pellegrino as Von McBride ("Red Menace")
 Frances Fisher as Victoria Abner ("Red Scare")
 Ron Canada as Philip Raimey ("Red Scare")
 Eric Ladin as Roddy Gerber ("Black Gold and Red Blood")
 Meredith Monroe as Verona Westlake ("Red Bulls")
 Kevin Sussman as Phil Redmond ("Rose-Colored Glasses")
 Gregory Sporleder as Terence Badali ("Rose-Colored Glasses")
 Jack Plotnick as Brett Partridge ("Red Sky in the Morning")
 Malcolm McDowell as Bret Stiles ("Red All Over")
 Rebecca Wisocky as Brenda Shettrick ("Bleeding Heart")
 Sharon Lawrence as Melba Walker Shannon ("Bleeding Heart")
 George Newbern as Cliff Edmunds ("Code Red")
 Evan Peters as Oliver McDaniel ("18-5-4")
 Melissa Fumero as Carmen Reyes (“Red Letter”)

Episodes

International reception
In the UK, the second season aired on FIVE, on Fridays at 9pm.  The series premiered on February 19, 2010, and concluded on July 23, 2010.  The season premiered with 3.10 million viewers.  The most watched episode of the season was Red Menace (3.17 million viewers), and the least watched was Aingavite Baa (2.09 million viewers), although the latter was broadcast at the later time of 10pm.

DVD release 
All 23 episodes were released on the five disc complete second season set. It was released on September 21, 2010 in Region 1, November 8, 2010 in Region 2, and November 10, 2010 in Region 4. It included the featurettes "Mentalism: A Subliminal Art" and "The Art of The Mentalist with Chris Long" as well as unaired scenes.

References

External links 
 

2009 American television seasons
2010 American television seasons
The Mentalist seasons